Belmond may refer to:

Places
Belmond, Iowa

Organisations
Belmond Limited

Hotels
Belmond El Encanto
Belmond Grand Hotel Timeo
Belmond Hotel Cipriani
Belmond Hotel Monasterio
Belmond Hotel Rio Sagrado
Belmond La Résidence d'Angkor
Belmond La Résidence Phou Vao
Belmond Maroma Resort & Spa
Belmond Villa Sant’Andrea
Belmond Villa San Michele
Belmond Splendido Mare
Belmond Splendido
Belmond Cap Juluca
Belmond Hotel Cipriani
Belmond Hotel Caruso
Belmond Villa Margherita
Belmond Mount Nelson Hotel
Belmond Cadogan Hotel
Belmond Napasai
Belmond Hotel das Cataratas
Belmond Copacabana Palace